Olszany may refer to the following places in Poland:
Olszany, Lubin County in Lower Silesian Voivodeship (south-west Poland)
Olszany, Świdnica County in Lower Silesian Voivodeship (south-west Poland)
Olszany, Subcarpathian Voivodeship (south-east Poland)
Olszany, Grójec County in Masovian Voivodeship (east-central Poland)
Olszany, Przysucha County in Masovian Voivodeship (east-central Poland)